The following is a list of episodes from the third season of ALF. Most episode titles are named after popular songs.

Broadcast history
The season aired Mondays at 8:00-8:30 pm (EST) on NBC.

DVD release
The season was released on DVD by Lionsgate Home Entertainment.

Cast
 Paul Fusco as ALF (puppeteer, voice)
 Lisa Buckley as ALF (assistant puppeteer)
 Bob Fappiano as ALF (assistant puppeteer)
 Max Wright as Willie Tanner
 Anne Schedeen as Kate Tanner
 Andrea Elson as Lynn Tanner
 Benji Gregory as Brian Tanner
 Charles Nickerson as Eric Tanner (debuted in "Having My Baby")

Episodes

References

ALF (TV series) seasons
1988 American television seasons
1989 American television seasons